Uberlândia is a municipality in the state of Minas Gerais, southeastern Brazil. It is the second largest municipality in the state of Minas Gerais after the state capital Belo Horizonte. Its population in 2020 was 699,097, making it the fourth largest city of the interior region of Brazil. It is an important logistic hub between São Paulo and Brasília. The city sits within the Brazilian cerrado and has eight protected zones of tropical savanna vegetation.

Uberlândia is served by Uberlândia–Ten. Cel. Av. César Bombonato Airport.

Geography

Uberlândia is located in the western part of the state of Minas Gerais, in the region called Triângulo Mineiro, one of the richest agricultural regions of Brazil, between the Paranaíba and Grande rivers. It is connected to major cities by the following federal highways: BR-050, BR-365, BR-455, BR-452, and BR-497. Uberlândia is about 580 km away from São Paulo, connected by a modern and safe double trace highway (BR-050). The capital of the state of Minas Gerais, Belo Horizonte, is 560 km away and Brasília, the capital of the country, lies just  to the north. There are railways connecting Uberlândia via the north-south Centro-Atlântica line.

Uberlândia is a statistical micro-region including the following municipalities: Araguari, Araporã, Canápolis, Cascalho Rico, Centralina, Indianópolis, Monte Alegre de Minas, Prata, Tupaciguara, and Uberlândia. The population density (2000) was 43.38 inhabitants/km2.

Due to its location and transport links, Uberlândia has been chosen as a point for the Free Economic Zone of Manaus, the first ever such distribution point.

According to the modern (2017) geographic classification by Brazil's National Institute of Geography and Statistics (IBGE), the city is the main municipality in the Intermediate Geographic Region of Uberlândia.

Religion
According to the 2010 census its citizens are members of the Roman Catholic Church (54.73%), while Evangelical Christians comprise the second largest religious affiliation in the city (25.23%). There are also minorities of Spiritists (7.80%) and not religious (7.80%). There are smaller minorities adhering the Brazilian Catholic Apostolic Church, the Eastern Orthodox Church, Jehovah's Witnesses, The Church of Jesus Christ of Latter-day Saints, Islam, Buddhism, indigenous beliefs, Umbanda and Candomblé, (all below 1% of Uberlândia's population).

Tourism
The city has architectural, culture, and natural values. Here are the main attractions in the city:
Municipal Market of Uberlândia: It is located at the centre of the city. It was established in 1923, but only had its construction started in 1944, under the tenure of Mayor Vasconcelos Costa, with modern era architecture. It was a wholesaler centre until 1977, when the commerce was transferred to the Ceasa. It is situated in Olegario Máciel Road, and offers diverse typical products from the state of Minas Gerais.
Municipal Museum of Uberlândia: It is located at the centre of the city, on the Clarimundo Carneiro Square. The same building had been used as City Hall. It has been reformed and today is a place where many cultural projects take place.
Sabiá Park It is a park/zoo administrated by FUTEL (the Uberlândian Foundation for Tourism, Sport and Leisure), located in the borough of Tibery, on the East Zone of the city. It is a green complex made up of a Zoo with dozens of animals in captivity; seven lakes that come together to form one big lagoon; an aquarium that has 36 tanks and 36 different fish species; a running track of 5.100 meters; and much more.
Municipal Park Victoria Siquierolli: It is located on the North Zone of Uberlândia, being where legitimate examples of vegetation of the Brazilian cerrado can be found, with trees with leathery leaves, twisted trunks, colourful flowers and many fruits, as well as a playground for children and a biodiversity museum. Its total area complies of a total of 232 300 square meters and is located between the boroughs of Jardim América II, Residencial Gramado, Nossa Senhora das Graças e Cruzeiro do Sul.
Rondon Pacheco Avenue: It is considered to be the “gastronomic corridor” of Uberlândia. Around it is where the nightlife in Uberlândia can be found, having many bars, restaurants, cachaçarias, pizzerias, cafes, ice cream parlours and sweet shops. There are more than 60 establishments across the avenue. Furthermore, the avenue also has many hotels, convenience stores, gas stations, supermarkets and hypermarkets. The avenue cuts the city from east to west. The Governor Rondon Pacheco Avenue starts with its merge with the Silvio Regain Avenue, on the Tubalina borough, on the southeast region of the city, and ends up on the BR-050 highway, on the furthest side of the Custodio Pereira borough, on the west region of the city.

See also
List of municipalities in Minas Gerais

References

External links

 City Hall of Uberlândia website
 Government of the State of Minas Gerais website

Municipalities in Minas Gerais